Sardar Zulfiqar Ali Khosa (born 20 October 1935) is a Pakistani political leader, former senator and former Governor of Punjab. He represented Punjab, Pakistan in the Senate of Pakistan. Sardar Zulfiqar Ali Khan has been elected to the Provincial Assembly of Punjab for ten consecutive tenures in 1964, 1970, 1977, 1985, 1988, 1990, 1993, 1997, 2002 and 2008. Sardar Zulfiqar Ali Khan contested for a National Assembly of Pakistan in general election 2018 but lost to Sardar Muhammad Amjad Farooq Khan Khosa.

Biography
He comes from a Baloch Khosa tribe. He was born in Bahadurgarh, Dera Ghazi Khan District, Punjab, British India .

He became the Tumandar of the Khosa in 1935 after the death of his father, Dost Muhammad Khan Khosa.

He was the Governor of the Punjab from 17 August 1999 to 12 October 1999. He was a senator from Punjab, Pakistan, from 2012 to 2018.

He has three sons: Hissam Uddin Khan Khosa, Saif Uddin Khan Khosa, and Dost Muhammad Khosa.

References

Baloch politicians
Living people
Governors of Punjab, Pakistan
Pakistan Muslim League (N) politicians
Pakistan People's Party politicians
People from Dera Ghazi Khan District
Tumandars
1935 births
Pakistani senators (14th Parliament)